Bylong is a village in New South Wales, Australia, in the Mid-Western Regional Council.  It is located on the Bylong Valley Way.

The area is home to numerous horse studs. The champion racehorse and sire Heroic was born in the area.

Bylong hosts an annual Mouse racing event.

Access 
Bylong can be accessed from the Hunter Region by travelling west along the Golden Highway and turn onto the Bylong Valley Way,  before Sandy Hollow.

Railways 
The railway passes through a  tunnel in the Bylong Range,  to the east-southeast between the Bylong River and Murrumbo Creek valleys.

See also 
 Rylstone
 Mudgee
 Kandos
 Baerami

References 

Towns in New South Wales
Mid-Western Regional Council